Nedupuzha is a residential area situated in the City of Thrissur in Kerala state of India. Nedupuzha is Ward 44 of Thrissur Municipal Corporation.

References

See also
Thrissur
Thrissur District

Suburbs of Thrissur city